is a passenger railway station located in the city of Takasago, Hyōgo Prefecture, Japan, operated by the West Japan Railway Company (JR West).

Lines

Station layout
The station consists of a ground-level side platform and an island platform connected by an elevated station building; however one side of the island platform is not in use effectively giving the station two opposed side platforms. The station is staffed.

Platforms

History
Hōden Station opened on 14 May 1900. With the privatization of the Japan National Railways (JNR) on 1 April 1987, the station came under the aegis of the West Japan Railway Company.

Station numbering was introduced in March 2018 with Hōden being assigned station number JR-A80.

Passenger statistics
In fiscal 2019, the station was used by an average of 9722 passengers daily

Surrounding area
 Ishi no Hōden National Historic Site
 Takasago City Sports Park
Kakogawa Sports Park
Hyogo Prefectural Toban Technical High School
Takasago City Hoden Junior High School

See also
List of railway stations in Japan

References

External links

 JR West Station Official Site

Railway stations in Hyōgo Prefecture
Sanyō Main Line
Railway stations in Japan opened in 1900
Takasago, Hyōgo